Achari America Yatra is a 2018 Telugu comedy film directed by G. Nageswara Reddy. The film stars Vishnu Manchu, Pragya Jaiswal, and Brahmanandam. It was produced by Kirthi Chowdary and Kittu. The film was remade in Odia in 2019 as Golmaal Love starring Babushan.

Plot
Kedari Krishnamachari (Vishnu Manchu) is a young pundit working under Applacharya (Brahmanandam), along with two other pundits. In the opening scene, they conduct a hawan at a rich household, where due to smoke, an elderly man dies, apparently due to asthma attack. The relatives blame the four pundits and go for their lives. They try taking refuge at a mosque and a church. When they find no other choice, Krishna insists on fleeing to America. Acharya reluctantly agrees after he reads Bhavishya vani that Krishna has tampered.

In America, they face the harsh realities, working odd jobs and living in a rented apartment. Krishna keeps searching for someone. Acharya manages to find a temple in Las Vegas, where he gets employed as a cleaner. There Krishna hears a female voice singing Krishna Bhajan and chases the singer. He sees a girl, Renuka (Pragya Jaiswal), leaving in a car and cheers, indicating this is the girl he had been looking for. In the temple, Acharya meets a woman (Surekha Vani), who says that her boss needs a pundit for his wedding. Acharya agrees.

They reach the home of the boss, Vikram alias Vicky (Thakur Anoop Singh), for conducting the engagement. There, they see Renuka and get shocked. Renuka sees Krishna and faints. A flashback starts.

Renuka arrives from America. Dadaji (Kota Srinivasa Rao), who is a wheelchair user, is very happy. He says that she is the heiress of all his properties. Her uncles are angry because she refused to marry his son Vicky. There is a four day long pooja in the house, and Acharya is called for that. During that time, Krishna accidentally sees Renuka nude and later confesses and apologizes. Renuka gets angry. She and her friend (Vidyullekha Raman) plot revenge schemes that always fail. But she is impressed when Krishna blesses a maid's daughter for her birthday. Renuka takes Dadaji for a stroll in the fields, when they are attacked. Krishna saves them. He suspects the uncles are behind the attack. Renuka and Krishna become closer. She says that on the final day of pooja she has some thing to say. The flashback ends.

Krishna tells Acharya and the pundits that Renuka left for America before the last day and he came to search for her. Renuka's friend tells them that Renuka had confessed to Dadaji about her feelings for Krishna. Her uncles heard and abused Dadaji and Renuka. Dadaji died of a heart attack when he saw Renuka being mistreated by her uncles and not for asthma. After Dadaji, died the uncles refused to give the ashes over to Renuka and said she had to marry Vicky to get them.

Krishna and the pundits make plans to steal the ashes from Vicky and flee with Renuka. When they manage after two tries, they are chased by Vicky's henchmen. They are accosted at an abandoned factory. The family lawyer (Posani Krishna Murali) tells Krishna to sign some papers. Everyone gets confused. The lawyer reveals that Dadaji had made Krishna his heir before he died, and also leaves a video evidence. Krishna refuses and fight ensues, where he manages to subdue all others.

At the ending, Krishna and Renuka visit Kasi to fulfil Dadaji's last wishes.

Cast
Vishnu Manchu as Krishnamachari 
Pragya Jaiswal as Renuka Devi 
Brahmanandam as Appalachari
Pradeep Rawat as Subbaraju
Thakur Anoop Singh as Vikram (Vicky)
Kota Srinivasa Rao as Chakrapani
Posani Krishna Murali as Chakrapani's family lawyer
Satya Krishnan as Devasena
Prudhvi Raj as Padma Rao (Train Passenger)
Vidyullekha Raman as Vidya, Renuka's friend
Prabhas Sreenu as Krishna's friend
Surekha Vani as Vikram's P.A
Master Bharath as Passanger #2 
Praveen as Appalachari's Assistant

Soundtrack

Reception
The Hindu wrote that "Nageshwar Reddy had the premise with scope to be developed further, but Achari America Yatra is a lazy effort at whipping up some laughs". The Times of India gave the film a 1 out of 5 saying, "This Yatra [pilgrimage] will take the audience on a ride they wouldn't want to remember."

References

External links

2018 films
2010s Telugu-language films
Indian comedy films
Films scored by Thaman S
Films shot in the United States
Telugu films remade in other languages
2018 comedy films
Films directed by G. Nageswara Reddy